Close Relations may refer to:

 Close Relations (1933 film)
 Close Relations (1935 film)